Arulmigu Maha Muthu Mariamman Thevasthanam is a Hindu temple located in Kopisan Baru, Gopeng, Kampar District, Perak, Malaysia.

History

The original temple was built in 1962 and it was known as Kaliamman Kovil.

In 1964, renovations were made to place Goddess Mariamman as the principal deity. This renovation works were led by Mr Suppaiyah and assisted by Mr Dorai,  Mr Periasamy, Mr Marugamuthu, Mr Nallapiravi and Mr Sangkaran. The contractor was Mr Arjunan. On 22 September 1967, the temple was registered as Sri Muthumariaman Kovil.

The Goddess Kaliamman and the left hall had to be relocated due to the reduction of the temple land size. The temple committee considered a proposal to relocate the Goddess Kaliamman and the hall in the existing temple building. However, the committee found that the proposal was not suitable due to lack of space in the existing temple building. Therefore, the temple committee came up with a plan to build a new building to replace the existing temple.

The ground breaking ceremony for the new temple was held on 10 December 2006 and construction work commenced soon after. On 4 May 2009, the temple was renamed as Arulmigu Maha Mariamman Thevasthanam. The construction works of this temple has been completed and the Kumbabishekam ceremony was successfully conducted on 12 December 2010.

Mystical stories

Story 1

A group of eagles was seen circling nearby this temple during the height of the Kumbabishega ceremony. It is believed that the eagles represents Garuda - the vahana of Lord Vishnu. It is believed that the presence of Garuda indicates that lord Vishnu has blessed the occasion.

Gallery

Notes

Footnotes

External links
 Arulmigu Maha Muthu Mariamman Thevasthanam
 New Hindu Temple Building in Kopisan Baru
 Maha Kumbhabhishekam, Kopisan Gopeng

20th-century Hindu temples
Mariamman temples
Hindu temples in Malaysia
Tamil diaspora in Malaysia
Religious buildings and structures in Perak
Tourist attractions in Perak